Männel is a surname. Notable people with the surname include:

 Martin Männel (born 1988), German footballer
 Otto Männel (1887–1964), German cyclist
 Wolfgang Männel (1937–2006), German professor

German-language surnames